Hemlock is an unincorporated community in Floyd County, Virginia, United States.

References

Unincorporated communities in Virginia
Unincorporated communities in Floyd County, Virginia